Johann Geyer (born 12 August 1942) is an Austrian footballer. He played in nine matches for the Austria national football team from 1962 to 1971.

References

External links
 

1942 births
Living people
Austrian footballers
Austria international footballers
Place of birth missing (living people)
Association footballers not categorized by position